The Sampit River begins in a swampy area of western Georgetown County, South Carolina, USA.  It flows in an easterly direction to Winyah Bay at Georgetown. Only small crafts can navigate the upper parts of the river. The lower river merges into the bay and is deepened by tidal flows, and (to Georgetown harbor) by dredging.

During colonial and antebellum years, areas near the river were developed extensively for rice cultivation, on large plantations dependent on labor of African slaves. They created complex earthworks with dams and other elements to irrigate the rice fields using tidewaters. In this and other areas of the Low Country, African Americans developed the Gullah people and culture, a distinct creole culture with strong connections through culture, language and cuisine to West African peoples.

Invasive species
In 2006, a Pacu fish was caught in the upper portion of the river. The Pacu is a relative of the Pirana and native to South America. South Carolina DNR officials say this find highlights the danger of individuals releasing non-native fish to the wild. Non-native fish can sometimes outcompete the local fish for habitat and food, killing them off, with devastating effects on fisheries.

Rivers of Georgetown County, South Carolina
Rivers of South Carolina
Tributaries of the Pee Dee River